Carinthia Mount Rinka or the Cross, with an elevation of , is a mountain in the central Kamnik–Savinja Alps in northern Slovenia. It is connected via a pass with Carniola Mount Rinka (Kranjska Rinka), the northern ridge descends to the Jezersko Pass and the Savinja Pass, whereas the western ridge with Styria Mount Rinka (Štajerska Rinka) ends with the Turski Žleb Ravine. There is also the fourth Rinka, called Little Mount Rinka. The names of the mountains reflect their positions at the border between the traditional Slovene regions of Carinthia, Carniola, and Styria.

Starting points  
 Zgornje Jezersko (906 m)
 Logar Valley (761 m)

Routes 
 3h: from the Carniolan Lodge at Ledine, passing the Jezersko Pass
 3½h: from the Frischauf Lodge at Okrešelj, through the Turski Žleb Ravine

External links 
 
 Carinthia Mount Rinka on hribi.net Route Description and Photos. 
 Carinthia Mount Rinka on Summitpost.org

Mountains of the Kamnik–Savinja Alps
Mountains of Carinthia (Slovenia)
Two-thousanders of Slovenia